Harold John Ockenga (June 6, 1905 – February 8, 1985) was a leading figure of mid-20th-century American Evangelicalism, part of the reform movement known as "Neo-Evangelicalism".  A Congregational minister, Ockenga served for many years as pastor of Park Street Church in Boston, Massachusetts.  He was also a prolific author on biblical, theological, and devotional topics. Ockenga helped to found the Fuller Theological Seminary and Gordon-Conwell Theological Seminary, as well as the National Association of Evangelicals (NAE).

Early life and education
Ockenga was born on June 6, 1905, and raised in Chicago as the only son of Angie and Herman Ockenga. Ockenga's father had German ancestry, the name Ockenga is East Frisian. Harold Ockenga was baptized at Austin Presbyterian Church, and his mother later brought him to Olivet Methodist Episcopal Church of which he became a member at age eleven. As a teenager, he had a strong sense of God calling him to pastoral ministry. He began his undergraduate education at Taylor University, a then-Methodist institution in Indiana.

After graduating from Taylor in 1927, Ockenga enrolled as a student at Princeton Theological Seminary but did not complete his theological studies there. In the midst of the "fundamentalist-modernist controversy" facing Christianity in the 1920s, he and many conservative classmates followed those members of the faculty - such as J. Gresham Machen, Robert Dick Wilson and Cornelius Van Til - who withdrew from Princeton to establish the Westminster Theological Seminary in Philadelphia in 1929.

Ockenga graduated from Westminster in 1930, after which he enrolled as a student in philosophy at the University of Pittsburgh to research on Marxism. He was awarded the PhD degree in 1939. During his studies at Pittsburgh he met Audrey Williamson, had a whirlwind courtship, and married in 1935.

Pastoral career 
Ockenga began his pastoral ministry in New Jersey, at two Methodist churches. In 1931 he accepted an invitation from Clarence E. Macartney to become a pastoral assistant at the First Presbyterian Church of Pittsburgh. During 1931 both Machen and Macartney recommended Ockenga for the position of pastor at Point Breeze Presbyterian church, in Pittsburgh. Ockenga went to be the associate pastor at Park Street Church, Boston, MA in 1936.

In 1937, at Conrad's death, Ockenga was appointed to succeed Arcturus Z. Conrad as the pastor of the Park Street Church in Boston. He continued in that post until 1969. During his pastoral career at Park Street, Ockenga delivered many sermons that later formed the substance of various books he wrote. In all he wrote a dozen books dealing with biblical themes, and pastoral commentaries on biblical texts and bible characters. His congregation thrived during much of his pastorate as he exercised considerable talents as a preacher, evangelist, leader and organizer.

In 1950, Park Street Church hosted Billy Graham's (first mid-century transcontinental) evangelistic crusade, which was regarded as highly successful. On the strength of that event, both Graham and Ockenga then conducted an evangelistic tour of New England. Ockenga later assisted Graham, Nelson Bell and Carl F. H. Henry in organizing the evangelical periodical, Christianity Today. He served as chairman of the board of the magazine until 1981.

Evangelical reformer and leader

Fundamentalist controversy 

In addition to his pastoral career and writings, Ockenga became a significant leader in a mid-twentieth-century reforming movement known as Neo-Evangelicalism or the New Evangelicalism. Its roots are found in the theological controversy between Protestant Fundamentalists and Protestant Liberals or Modernists in the earlier part of the twentieth century. Much of the controversy centered on questions of the historicity of the Bible, biblical inerrancy, biblical interpretation, creationism and evolution, and various doctrines such as the deity of Christ, the Virgin Birth of Christ, the Atonement, the bodily resurrection of Christ, and the Second Advent of Christ. The reaction of many Fundamentalists to the influence of liberal Protestant theology and modern secular beliefs led to a withdrawal from many of the mainline denominations and institutions. In addition, the Fundamentalists believed that anyone, regardless of religious outlook, could be involved with social action and so they wanted to retreat to deal only with the "Spiritual Gospel." 

However, Ockenga and some other younger and emerging figures inside those churches felt uncomfortable about the militant isolation from culture. Ockenga also believed that Jesus came to deal with the physical well-being in addition to the more serious spiritual well-being of the people he met. Alongside of Ockenga were figures such as Carl F. H. Henry, Harold Lindsell, Wilbur M. Smith, and Edward John Carnell.

Neo-Evangelical Social Engagement 

Towards the end of the Second World War, Ockenga founded War Relief and the War Relief Commission (1944) to deal with the situation abroad. He believed that Neo-Evangelicalism would lack credibility if Christians did not meet the physical needs of those who desperately needed assistance and only preached a spiritual Gospel. War Relief later became World Relief.

Neo-Evangelical Education 

In an effort to redress these concerns Ockenga and J. Elwin Wright of the New England Fellowship planned the establishing of a new organisation known as the National Association of Evangelicals. Ockenga served as its founding president from 1942-1944. Those affiliated with the association were interested in maintaining many of the biblical concerns that militant fundamentalists held to. However they also sought to reform fundamentalism from what they perceived as its anti-cultural and anti-intellectual tendencies.

Another indicator of the effort to reform fundamentalism is located in the efforts of the founding fathers of Fuller Theological Seminary in Pasadena, California. The seminary was initially conceived of as the Evangelical Caltech, where excellence in scholarship would dovetail with faithfulness to orthodox Protestant beliefs, and yield a renovation of western culture from secular unbelief. The seminary would become a launching pad for a new generation of zealous evangelicals who would rigorously engage in critical dialogue with Liberal theology and modern secular thought, as well as cultivating skills in those who would propel mass evangelism and worldwide missions. The principal founding figures of Fuller Seminary included Charles E. Fuller (radio evangelist), Ockenga, Carl Henry, and Harold Lindsell.

The seminary opened in September 1947, and Ockenga was appointed seminary president. However, Ockenga was reluctant to relinquish his pastoral post and so much to the chagrin of his seminary colleagues he served as president in absentia from 1947-54. He was succeeded by Edward John Carnell. Ockenga resumed his post as president in absentia from 1960-63 following Carnell's resignation.

This overall ferment for reform in fundamentalism, as exemplified in the establishing of the National Association of Evangelicals, Fuller Seminary and Christianity Today magazine came to be known as Neo-Evangelicalism.  A part of the movement was its opposition to Roman Catholicism, a concern that Ockenga embraced.  For example, he was one of the thirty or so leaders who met for a strategy session with Billy Graham in mid-August 1960 in Montreaux, Switzerland, to plan how the movement could best oppose the candidacy of Senator John F. Kennedy for the presidency that year.  They planned a meeting for the new National Conference for Citizens for Religious Freedom the following month in Washington.  Ockenga was one of the spokesmen for the group, whose initial gathering on September 7 was pilloried by the media as the "Peale Group," after its chairman, the champion of positive thinking, Norman Vincent Peale. The term may or may not have been originally coined by Ockenga, but in 1948 at the Civic Auditorium in Pasadena, California his speech gave birth to the movement.

In the foreword to The Battle For the Bible by Harold Lindsell, Ockenga further defined the term neo-evangelicalism:

Neo-evangelicalism was born in 1948 in connection with a convocation address which I gave in the Civic Auditorium in Pasadena. While reaffirming the theological view of fundamentalism, this address repudiated its ecclesiology and its social theory. The ringing call for a repudiation of separatism and the summons to social involvement received a hearty response from many Evangelicals. ... It differed from fundamentalism in its repudiation of separatism and its determination to engage itself in the theological dialogue of the day. It had a new emphasis upon the application of the gospel to the sociological, political, and economic areas of life.

Later career 
The first sixteen years of work at Fuller Theological Seminary witnessed the development of two outlooks among staff and students: conservative and progressive evangelicalism. Among the conservatives, such as Ockenga, Henry, Lindsell and Smith, there was some concern that others such as David Hubbard, Paul Jewett and Daniel Fuller held to a different view of biblical inerrancy.

Those who differed with the conservatives held to a vision for progressive thought among evangelicals on theological, biblical and ethical issues. With Ockenga's final departure from the role of president in absentia, the seminary shifted into a different phase of growth under the direction of those identified with progressive thinking.

Much of the history of these tensions between conservatives and progressives are discussed in George Marsden's history of the seminary.

When Ockenga retired from Park Street Church in 1969 he was appointed president of Gordon College and Divinity School. His desire was to recreate on the U.S. East Coast something of the essence of what had been planned for Fuller seminary. In the late 1960s, therefore, Ockenga entered into negotiations to merge two institutions: Gordon Divinity School and the Conwell School of Theology. He collaborated with people such as J. Howard Pew, Billy Graham and Walter Martin in establishing Gordon-Conwell Theological Seminary. Ockenga served as its president from 1970–79, with figures like Walter Martin sitting on the seminary's board.

Ockenga died of cancer on Friday, February 8, 1985. At his funeral service on Monday, February 11, 1985, was an old friend: Billy Graham. "He was a giant among giants," Graham reflected. "Nobody outside of my family influenced me more than he did. I never made a major decision without first calling and asking his advice and counsel. I thank God for his friendship and his life."

Works

Books

Articles

See also 
 Evangelicalism in the United States

References

Biographical sources 
 Joel A. Carpenter, ed. Two Reformers of Fundamentalism: Harold John Ockenga and Carl F. H. Henry (New York: Garland Publishing, 1988).
 H. Crosby Englizian, Brimstone Corner: Park Street Church, Boston (Chicago: Moody Press, 1968).
 Harold Lindsell, Park Street Prophet: A Life of Harold John Ockenga (Wheaton: Van Kampen Press, 1951).
 Garth M. Rosell, The Surprising Work of God: Harold John Ockenga, Billy Graham, and the Rebirth of Evangelicalism (Grand Rapids: Baker Academic, 2008).
 The personal library and papers of Harold John Ockenga are archived at Gordon Conwell Theological Seminary.

Other relevant historical and biographical sources 

 George Marsden, Reforming Fundamentalism: Fuller Seminary and the New Evangelicalism (Grand Rapids: William B. Eerdmans, 1987).
 James DeForest Murch, Cooperation without Compromise: A History of the National Association of Evangelicals (Grand Rapids: William B. Eerdmans, 1956).
 Stephen J. Nichols, ed. J. Gresham Machen's the Gospel and the Modern World and Other Short Writings (Phillipsburg: Presbyterian and Reformed Publishing, 2005) - includes correspondence between Machen and Ockenga.
 Robert Wuthnow The Restructuring of American Religion: Society and Faith Since World War II

External links 
 Web-page of Park Street Congregational Church, Boston
 Harold John Ockenga Institute at Gordon Conwell Theological Seminary 
 Short history of Gordon-Conwell Theological Seminary

1905 births
1985 deaths
20th-century evangelicals
20th-century theologians
American evangelicals
American theologians
Christian fundamentalism
Evangelical theologians
Founders of schools in the United States
Fuller Theological Seminary faculty
Gordon–Conwell Theological Seminary faculty
People from Chicago
Seminary presidents
Taylor University alumni
University and college founders
University of Pittsburgh alumni
Westminster Theological Seminary alumni